Keene is a home rule-class city located in Jessamine County, Kentucky, in the United States. It is home to the Keene Springs Hotel. The U.S. Census Bureau does not record Keene as a city and does not publish a population figure for the community.

History
The community grew up around a stone mill erected in 1794 and was originally laid out as North Liberty in 1813. In 1830, however, the first postmaster, Ephraim Carter, named his new post office after Keene, New Hampshire, the hometown he shared with local store owner Harvey Huggins. The city was formally incorporated by the state assembly in 1844.

It was also known as "Hard Scrabble".

Keene was home to the Keene Industrial Institute, an industrial school for African Americans for a couple of years at the beginning of the 20th century.

Geography
It sits on the north side of the valley of a tributary of Cave Spring Creek, flowing west to Clear Creek, a tributary of the Kentucky River.

Demographics

Climate
The climate in this area is characterized by hot, humid summers and generally mild to cool winters.  According to the Köppen Climate Classification system, Keene has a humid subtropical climate, abbreviated "Cfa" on climate maps.

In popular culture
"Keene City", Kentucky is mentioned in the 2007 Hollywood-movie Shooter, starring Mark Wahlberg, as a place of refuge, where the main character of Bob Lee Swagger hides from the pursuit of the FBI and other governmental agencies, after a hunt for a suspected presidential assassin.

Notable people
 Jimmy Blythe, composer, pianist

References

Cities in Jessamine County, Kentucky
Cities in Kentucky